Gjonbalaj is an Albanian surname. Variations include Đonbaljaj, Đonbal(j)ić and Đombal(j)ić. It may refer to 

Ahmet Zenel Gjonbalaj (1803–1893), Albanian commander during the Albanian Renaissance
Dritan Gjonbalaj, Director General of the Civil Aviation Authority of Kosovo
Hodge Gjonbalaj, producer of 2015 instrumental rock album Nazar
Sadri Gjonbalaj (born 1966), Yugoslav-American soccer player

Albanian-language surnames